Top Model (or Top Model Stockholm; abbreviated as Top Model Sthlm) was the first individual season of the Swedish adaptation of Top Model, based in Stockholm. It was hosted by Vendela Kirsebom, who was hosting Norway's Next Top Model at the same time. The prize also included a worldwide campaign for Make Up Store and a contract with LA Models & New York Model Management

The winner of the competition was 18-year-old Hawa Ahmed. The runner-up, 19-year-old Margarita Maiseyenka, was deported from Sweden back to Belarus after the show aired, where she stayed for six months.

Contestants
(ages stated at start of contest)

Episodes

Episode 1:`Crying, Measuring Sticks & Glamor
Original Air Date: September 12, 2007

Casting episode.

Episode 2: Hard Awakening for the Models
Original Air Date: September 19, 2007

 First call-out: Daniella Pedersen
 Bottom two: Albulena Grajqevci & Jenny Andersson
 Eliminated: Albulena Grajqevci
 Featured photographer: Francis Hills

Episode 3: Make-over, Crying & Noise
Original Air Date: September 26, 2007

 First call-out: Hawa Ahmed
 Bottom two: Linda Lindén & Malin Karlén
 Eliminated: Linda Lindén
 Featured photographer: Carlo Bosco

Episode 4: Snygg-Lars greets...
Original Air Date: October 3, 2007

 First call-out: Hawa Ahmed
 Bottom two: Hanna Markendahl & Malin Karlén
 Eliminated: Hanna Markendahl
 Featured photographer: Francis Hills

Episode 5: Fatigue & Shortness of breath
Original Air Date: October 10, 2007

 First call-out: Jenny Andersson	
 Bottom two: Nadia Borra	& Pauline Naisubi
 Eliminated: Pauline Naisubi
 Featured photographer: Jacob Felländer

Episode 6: "Lack of respect!"
Original Air Date: October 17, 2007

 First call-out: Margarita Maiseyenka
 Bottom two: Daniella Pedersen & Nadia Borra
 Eliminated: Daniella Pedersen & Nadia Borra
 Featured photographer: Francis Hills

Episode 7: Ms. Jay says hello!
Original Air Date: October 24, 2007

 First call-out: Margarita Maiseyenka
 Bottom two: Jenny Andersson & Malin Karlén
 Eliminated: Malin Karlén
 Featured photographer: Francis Hills

Episode 8: Shameful & Noisy
Original Air Date: October 31, 2007

 First call-out: Pia Cossa Åkesson
 Bottom two: Jenny Andersson & Margarita Maiseyenka
 Eliminated: Jenny Andersson
 Featured photographer: Francis Hills

Episode 9: Drama on the Globe
Original Air Date: November 7, 2007

 Eliminated: None
 Featured photographer: Andreas von Gegerfelt

Episode 10
Original Air Date: November 14, 2007

 First call-out: Hawa Ahmed
 Bottom two: Margarita Maiseyenka & Pia Cossa Åkesson
 Eliminated: Pia Cossa Åkesson

Episode 11: Frozen Berries & Perfume
Original Air Date: December 5, 2007

 First call-out: Margarita Maiseyenka
 Bottom two: Hawa Ahmed & Sanna Lindfors
 Eliminated: Sanna Lindfors
 Featured photographer: Francis Hills

Episode 12: The Final
Original Air Date: December 12, 2007

 Final two: Hawa Ahmed & Margarita Maiseyenka
 Top Model Sthlm: Hawa Ahmed

Summaries

Call-out order

 The contestant was eliminated
 The contestant won the competition
In episode 9, no-one was eliminated

Photo Shoot Guide

Episode 1 Photoshoot: Pose in blue jeans and white shirt (casting)
Episode 2 Photoshoot: Superheroes in Stockholm
Episode 3 Photoshoot: Topless Beauty Shot
Episode 4 Photoshoot: Posing Topless in Black and White with a Male Model
Episode 5 Photoshoot: Yoga on the Water
Episode 6 Photoshoot: Country Couture
Episode 7 Photoshoot: Celebrity on the Red Carpet
Episode 8 Photoshoot: Posing with Animals
Episode 9 Photoshoot: Rooftop Shot atop the Globen
Episode 10 Photoshoot: Vintage Pin-ups
Episode 11 Photoshoot: Self-Provided and Directed Perfume Based on Personalities Endorsement
Episode 12 Photoshoot: Ballroom Dancer

References 

Sweden